Klaus-Dieter Neubert (born 22 November 1949) is a retired East German rowing coxswain, who had his best achievements in the coxed pairs, together with Wolfgang Gunkel and Jörg Lucke. They won the European title in 1971 and the Olympic gold medal in 1972, and finished second at the 1973 European and 1974 World Championships. Neubert placed fourth at the 1968 Olympics with another crew.

References

External links

 

1949 births
Living people
People from Oberwiesenthal
Coxswains (rowing)
Olympic rowers of East Germany
Rowers at the 1968 Summer Olympics
Rowers at the 1972 Summer Olympics
Olympic gold medalists for East Germany
Olympic medalists in rowing
East German male rowers
World Rowing Championships medalists for East Germany
Medalists at the 1972 Summer Olympics
European Rowing Championships medalists
Sportspeople from Saxony